Alvinia is a genus of minute sea snails with an operculum, marine gastropod mollusks or micromollusks in the family Rissoidae.

This genus has become a synonym of Alvania Risso, 1826. But it is still considered sometimes as a separate genus. It has been merged with Alvania until a consistent phylogenetic scheme emerges for the whole group.

Species 
Species in the genus Alvinia used to include:
 Alvinia aequisculpta (Keep, 1887): synonym of Alvania aequisculpta Keep, 1887
 Alvinia albolirata (Carpenter, 1864): synonym of Lirobarleeia albolirata (Carpenter, 1864)
 Alvinia almo (Bartsch, 1911): synonym of Alvania almo Bartsch, 1911
 Alvinia clarionensis (Bartsch, 1911): synonym of Lirobarleeia clarionensis (Bartsch, 1911)
 Alvinia contrerasi (Jordan, 1936): synonym of Lapsigyrus mutans (Carpenter, 1857)
 Alvinia cosmia (Bartsch, 1911): synonym of Alvania cosmia Bartsch, 1911
 Alvinia dictyophora (Philippi 1844): synonym of Alvania dictyophora (Philippi, 1844)
 Alvinia electrina (Carpenter, 1864): synonym of Lirobarleeia electrina (Carpenter, 1864)
 Alvinia epima (Dall & Simpson, 1901): synonym of Manzonia epima (Dall & Simpson, 1901)
 Alvinia galapagensis (Bartsch, 1911): synonym of Lirobarleeia galapagensis (Bartsch, 1911)
 Alvinia gallinacea (Finlay, 1930): synonym of Alvania gallinacea (Finlay, 1930)
 Alvinia gradatoides (Finlay, 1930): synonym of Alvania gradatoides (Finlay, 1930)
 Alvinia granti (Strong, 1938): synonym of Lirobarleeia granti (Strong, 1938)
 Alvinia halia (Bartsch, 1911): synonym of Alvania halia Bartsch, 1911
 Alvinia hoodensis (Bartsch, 1911): synonym of Lirobarleeia hoodensis (Bartsch, 1911)
 Alvinia ima (Bartsch, 1911): synonym of Alvania ima Bartsch, 1911
 Alvinia inconspicua (C. B. Adams, 1852): synonym of Alvania monserratensis Baker, Hanna & Strong, 1930
 Alvinia ingrami (Hertlein & Strong, 1951): synonym of Lirobarleeia ingrami (Hertlein & Strong, 1951)
 Alvinia lara (Bartsch, 1911): synonym of Lirobarleeia lara (Bartsch, 1911)
 Alvinia milleriana Carpenter, 1951: synonym of Lapsigyrus mutans (Carpenter, 1857)
 Alvinia moniziana (Watson, 1873): synonym of Alvania moniziana (Watson, 1873)
 Alvinia monserratensis (Baker, Hanna & Strong, 1930): synonym of Alvania monserratensis Baker, Hanna & Strong, 1930
 Alvinia mutans (Carpenter, 1857): synonym of Lapsigyrus mutans (Carpenter, 1857)
 Alvinia myriosirissa (Shasky, 1970): synonym of Lapsigyrus myriosirissa Shasky, 1970
 Alvinia nemo (Bartsch, 1911): synonym of Lirobarleeia nemo (Bartsch, 1911)
 Alvinia perlata (Mørch, 1860): synonym of Lirobarleeia perlata (Mörch, 1860)
 Alvinia profundicola (Bartsch, 1911): synonym of Alvania profundicola Bartsch, 1911
 Alvinia purpurea (Dall, 1871): synonym of Alvania purpurea Dall, 1871
 Alvinia tumida (Carpenter, 1857): synonym of Alvania tumida Carpenter, 1857
 Alvinia veleronis (Hertlein & Strong, 1939): synonym of Lirobarleeia veleronis (Hertlein & Strong, 1939)
 Alvinia weinkauffi (Weinkauff, 1868): synonym of Alvania weinkauffi Weinkauff, 1868
 Alvinia zetlandica Montagu, 1815: synonym of Alvania zetlandica (Montagu, 1815)

References

 Ponder W. F. (1985). A review of the Genera of the Rissoidae (Mollusca: Mesogastropoda: Rissoacea). Records of the Australian Museum supplement 4: 1-221  page(s): 48

Rissoidae